The 1994 Chinese Jia-A League season is the inaugural season of professional association football and the 33rd top-tier overall league season held in China. The league was expanded to twelve teams and  started on April 17, 1994 and ended on November 13 with Dalian Wanda winning the championship.

Overview
By the start of the 1994 league season the Chinese Football Association had been demanding full professionalism since 1992, this meant that private businesses were allowed to own or sponsor football clubs for the first time. The Chinese FA would also sell the television rights to CCTV for 450,000 Yuan and gain sponsorship for the league from Marlboro. Clubs were awarded with a 700,000 Yuan season appearance fee which saw the average monthly players wages jump up significantly from 100 Dollars to 2000 Dollars. With better wages clubs could now transfer professional foreign players except for Bayi who because they're part of the People's Liberation Army had to have active military members. The league was also expanded to twelve teams compared to eight from the previous season, while the four teams promoted came from the 1992 Chinese Jia-A League league season because there was no promotion or relegation held in the 1993 Chinese Jia-A League league season. By the end of the season Dalian Wanda won their first ever  championship while Shenyang Liuyao and Jiangsu Maint were relegated at the end of the season.

Name changes
With clubs now professional units they were allowed to gain sponsorship and would often change the clubs names to accommodate the sponsor. Below is a list of the dates on when the clubs officially became professional as well as when they gained their first sponsor and changed their name to accommodate this.

Dalian football club was reorganized as a professional unit on ( July 3, 1992 ), and renamed Dalian Wanda Football Club on March 8, 1994.
Guangdong Province football team football club was reorganized as a professional unit on ( September 15, 1992 ) and renamed Guangdong Hongyuan Football Club.
Beijing football team was reorganized as a professional unit on ( December 31, 1992 ) and renamed Beijing Guoan Football Club.
Guangzhou City football team was reorganized as a professional unit on ( January 8, 1993 ) and renamed Guangzhou Apollo Football Club.
Sichuan Province football team was reorganized as a professional unit on ( November 8, 1993 ) and renamed Sichuan Quanxing Football Club.
Shandong Province football team was reorganized as a professional unit on ( December 2, 1993 ) and renamed Shandong Taishan Football Club on January 29, 1994.
Shanghai football team was reorganized as a professional unit on ( December 10, 1993 ) and renamed Shanghai Shenhua Football Club.
Liaoning Province football team was reorganized as a professional unit on ( February 26, 1994 ) and renamed Liaoning Yuandong
Jiangsu Province football team was reorganized as a professional unit on ( March 28, 1994 ) and renamed Jiangsu Maint
Jilin Province football team was reorganized as a professional unit in ( 1994 ) and renamed Jilin Samsung Football Club
Shenyang City football team was reorganized as a professional unit at the end of ( 1995 ) and renamed Shenyang Liuyao Football Club.

Managerial changes

League standings

Top scorers

References

External links
China - List of final tables (RSSSF)
Statistics at Zuqiuziliao.cn 

Chinese Jia-A League seasons
1
China
China
1994 establishments in China